Linwood is an inner suburb of the city of Christchurch, New Zealand. It lies to the east of the city centre, mostly between Ferry Road and Linwood Avenue, two of the major arterial roads to the eastern suburbs of Christchurch.

History
Linwood was given its name by Joseph Brittan, who purchased rural section 300 in Avonside. The adjoining rural section 301 was to be part of the farm, but the right was sold but probably farmed with rural section 300 and was eventually bought back by his son in 1874. To this was added a small part of section 30 to give access in 1855 and 21-year lease for the adjoining sections in 1862 giving a total area of about 380 acres (about 150ha). He called the farm Linwood, as he was from Linwood, Hampshire. Brittan built Linwood House at 30 Linwood Avenue in 1857, which stood there until demolition following the February 2011 Christchurch earthquake.

Christchurch lacked an accessible port before the construction of the Lyttelton Rail Tunnel in 1867. This posed a significant problem for the fledgling city. A barge service along what is now Linwood Avenue was mooted prior to this tunnel but was never completed.

The Linwood Islamic Centre was the site of a mass shooting during the Christchurch mosque shootings on 15 March 2019.

Demographics

Linwood had a population of 9,783 at the 2018 New Zealand census, an increase of 1,161 people (13.5%) since the 2013 census, and an increase of 768 people (8.5%) since the 2006 census. There were 3,873 households. There were 5,043 males and 4,743 females, giving a sex ratio of 1.06 males per female, with 1,563 people (16.0%) aged under 15 years, 2,559 (26.2%) aged 15 to 29, 4,593 (46.9%) aged 30 to 64, and 1,074 (11.0%) aged 65 or older.

Ethnicities were 64.5% European/Pākehā, 16.9% Māori, 6.9% Pacific peoples, 21.3% Asian, and 3.9% other ethnicities (totals add to more than 100% since people could identify with multiple ethnicities).

The proportion of people born overseas was 31.8%, compared with 27.1% nationally.

Although some people objected to giving their religion, 45.9% had no religion, 32.0% were Christian, 5.9% were Hindu, 1.7% were Muslim, 1.2% were Buddhist and 6.1% had other religions.

Of those at least 15 years old, 1,503 (18.3%) people had a bachelor or higher degree, and 1,635 (19.9%) people had no formal qualifications. The employment status of those at least 15 was that 4,215 (51.3%) people were employed full-time, 1,101 (13.4%) were part-time, and 459 (5.6%) were unemployed.

Economy

Retail

Linwood's commercial area is concentrated around the intersection of Linwood Avenue, Aldwins Road  and Buckleys Road.

Eastgate Mall covers an area of 30,500 m². It has 1100 carparks and 37 shops, including The Warehouse, Countdown, Warehouse Stationery, Number One Shoes and Lincraft.

Parks

The largest parks in Linwood are Bromley Park and the adjacent Linwood Cemetery, followed by Beverley Park and the North Linwood Community Park. As there are no defined suburb boundaries in Christchurch, post code boundaries are sometimes used for suburb boundaries (e.g. by Google Maps). According to Google Maps, most of Woodham Park is located in Linwood whilst only part of Linwood Park belongs to the eponymous suburb. Most commonly, Aldwins Road and Linwood Avenue are considered the boundary roads of Woolston and if so, Linwood Park is located in Woolston.

Education
Linwood College is a secondary school for years 7 to 13. The school opened in 1954.

Te Pā o Rākaihautū is a Kura Kaupapa Māori composite school which teaches years 1 to 13 in the Māori language. It was founded in 2015.

Linwood Avenue opened in 1928, and Whītau opened in 1908 as Linwood North School.

All of these are coeducational state schools. Rolls are as of

Notable people
 Lianne Dalziel

References

Suburbs of Christchurch